Nasrabad-e Olya (also Romanized as Naşrābād-e ‘Olyā; also known as Naşrābād and Naşrābād-e Bālā) is a village in Eshqabad Rural District, Miyan Jolgeh District, Nishapur County, Razavi Khorasan Province, Iran. At the 2006 census, its population was 51, in 12 families.

References 

Populated places in Nishapur County